The Helmut Ullrich Astronomical Observatory is an observatory situated on Col Drusciè, a mountain peak in the Dolomites located within Cortina d'Ampezzo, Italy.

The observatory hosts a remote control system called "Sky on the Web", which allows users to control the operation of the observatory remotely, including telescope pointing, image taking and processing, image downloading on one's home PC, weather alerts.  The amateur astronomers that manage the observatory are mainly involved in comet studies and galaxy observations, in order to search for supernovae.  In the framework of CROSS (Col drusciè Remote Observatory Supernovae Search) program they have discovered so far 30 supernovae and one minor planet (called "Cortina d'Ampezzo").

See also
 List of astronomical observatories

References

External links

Astronomical observatories in Italy